Taková normální rodinka (film)  is a Czech comedy film. It was released in 2008.

Cast 
 Eva Holubová as Hanáková
 Jaromír Dulava as Hanák
 Monika Zoubková as Kateřina
 Jiří Mádl as Zdeněk
 Ivana Chýlková as Zdeňkova matka
 Luboš Kostelný as Petr
 Vanda Hybnerová as Pavla
 Lillian Malkina as Babička
 Adam Mišík as Raubíř Pavel
 Štěpán Krtička as Raubíř Petr
 Marián Labuda as Poštolka

External links
 

2008 films
2008 comedy films
Czech comedy films
2000s Czech films